Lenka Krobotová (born 10 March 1977) is a Czech actress. She won the Czech Lion award for Best Supporting Actress in 2014 for her role in the film Díra u Hanušovic. She is the daughter of actor and director Miroslav Krobot and the actress Hana Doulová.

References

External links

1977 births
Living people
Czech film actresses
Actors from Plzeň
20th-century Czech actresses
21st-century Czech actresses
Czech television actresses
Czech stage actresses